John Tiktak (Inuktitut syllabics: ᔭᓐ ᑎᑕ )  (1916 in Kareak camp – 1981) was a Canadian Inuk sculptor who spent most of his artistic career in Rankin Inlet. Most of his sculptures take the human form as their subject.

Biography
Tiktak lived a traditional Inuit lifestyle until he moved to Arviat (then known as Eskimo Point and also called Aqviat) in the 1950s. He moved to Rankin Inlet (also known as Kangiqilniq) in 1958, where he began to work as a sculptor in 1963.

His figurative work is minimal in style, and so is modern in appearance. Distinctive stylistic traits include very rounded forms and hands that are attached to the sides of the figure, so that the arms are circular in shape.

Honors

 Elected a member of the Royal Canadian Academy of Arts, 1973

References

External links
John Tiktak biography at the Canadian Art Database
Timeline of works at the Canadian Art Database

Inuit sculptors
1916 births
1981 deaths
Members of the Royal Canadian Academy of Arts
Inuit from the Northwest Territories
People from Rankin Inlet
People from Arviat
Artists from Nunavut
20th-century Canadian sculptors